Radio UNO or UNO Radio is a Bosnian local commercial radio station, broadcasting from Banja Luka, Bosnia and Herzegovina. This radio station broadcasts a variety of programs such as pop-rock music and local news. The owner of the radio station is the company ELID d.o.o. Banja Luka.

Program is mainly produced in Serbian language at one FM frequency (Banja Luka ) and it is available in the city of Banja Luka as well as in nearby municipalities.

Estimated number of listeners of Radio UNO is around 144.267.

Frequencies
 Banja Luka

See also 
 List of radio stations in Bosnia and Herzegovina
 Big Radio 1
 Radio A
 Pop FM
 Hard Rock Radio
 Plavi FM
 Nes Radio

References

External links 
 www.unoportal.net
 www.radiostanica.ba
 www.fmscan.org
 Communications Regulatory Agency of Bosnia and Herzegovina

Banja Luka
Radio stations established in 1998
Mass media in Banja Luka